"Bubbly" is the debut single of American singer Colbie Caillat from her first album, Coco (2007). Written by Caillat and Jason Reeves and produced by Mikal Blue, the song was released as the album's lead single on May 15, 2007. "Bubbly" is Caillat's highest-charting hit and is her only single to reach the top 10 of the US Billboard Hot 100. Internationally, "Bubbly" reached number one in Australia, Brazil, and the Czech Republic. It also became a top-10 hit in several European countries, including Belgium, Germany, and Norway.

The song's music video, directed by Liz Friedlander, aired on MTV, VH1 and CMT. A still from the music video was used as the cover for Caillat's debut album, Coco.

Background and composition

"Bubbly" was written by Colbie Caillat and Jason Reeves. It  is written in the key of A and primarily features a gentle guitar instrumentation which uses a capo of seventh fret. The guitar uses open D tuning (low to high): D–A–D–F–A–D. Caillat's vocal range spans from E3 to F4.

Caillat commented on the lyrical composition of the song in an interview with Wilson County News on February 20, 2008, following her live performance on The View, "I didn't write "Bubbly" for any [special] guy. I wrote it about the feelings you get when you have a crush on somebody, and when they give you butterflies in your stomach and they just make you smile."

Reception

Critical response
Susan Visakowitz of Billboard wrote that Caillat's "warm vocals along with a gentle acoustic arrangement effortlessly conjure the idyllic California she calls home".

Commercial performance
On the issue dated October 6, 2007, "Bubbly" rose from number 16 to number 10 on the Billboard Hot 100, eventually peaking at number five for seven non-consecutive weeks. It also topped the Hot Adult Contemporary Tracks and Hot Adult Top 40 Tracks charts for 19 and 14 weeks, respectively. The song was placed at number two on the Hot Adult Contemporary Tracks year-end chart of 2008, behind Sara Bareilles' "Love Song". The single was certified platinum by the Recording Industry Association of America on December 13, 2007, with sales of more than 2.6 million downloads in the US. It peaked at number two for three weeks on the Canadian Hot 100. In Australia—where "Bubbly" was used in a promotional video for the Seven Network soap opera Home and Away—it reached number one on the ARIA Singles Chart for the week of April 7, 2008. Elsewhere, the single reached number one in the Czech Republic and charted within the top ten in Austria, Belgium, Germany, the Netherlands, New Zealand, Norway, Slovakia, and Sweden. It did not fare as well in the British Isles, peaking at number 58 in the United Kingdom and number 48 in Ireland.

On VH1's 100 Greatest Songs of the '00s, "Bubbly" ranked number 71 on the list.

Music video

Synopsis

Filmed in Colbie Caillat's hometown of Malibu and in Santa Barbara in southern California, the music video features intercut scenes of Caillat playing the guitar while dreamily singing the lyrics of the song and spending time with her lover in their home and out in nature. It is a sunny day, and some shots feature Caillat in fields as she sings. Later in the video, Caillat drives in an old Bronco and then is pictured singing as she walks slowly along the coast of California and looks out over a cliff into the Pacific Ocean. Caillat performs clad in a simple tank top and jeans which are slightly ripped at the knees; she also is seen wearing a necklace made of sea shells.

Reception
Uploaded to Caillat's YouTube and Vevo account on December 13, 2009, the video for "Bubbly" has received a generally positive reaction from fans and has garnered over 125 million views.

Track listings
 Australian CD single
 "Bubbly" – 3:17
 "Circles" – 3:53
 "Magic" (piano version) – 3:18
 "Bubbly" (video) – 3:25

 UK CD single
 "Bubbly" – 3:17
 "Circles" – 3:53

 European CD single
 "Bubbly" – 2:53
 "Magic" (piano version) – 3:18

Personnel
 Colbie Caillat – vocals
 Mikal Blue – acoustic guitar, bass, synthesizer, production, engineering, mixing
 Jaco Caraco – electric guitar
 Victor Indrizzo – drums
 Ken Caillat – mixing
 Doug Sax – mastering

Charts

Weekly charts

Year-end charts

Decade-end charts

All-time charts

Certifications

Release history

See also
 List of Hot Adult Top 40 Tracks number-one singles of 2007
 List of Billboard Adult Contemporary number ones of 2008
 List of number-one singles of 2008 (Australia)

References

2007 debut singles
2007 songs
Colbie Caillat songs
Music videos directed by Liz Friedlander
Number-one singles in Australia
Number-one singles in the Czech Republic
Songs written by Colbie Caillat
Songs written by Jason Reeves (songwriter)
Universal Republic Records singles
Pop ballads